Cassandra Tollbring (born 19 March 1993)  is a Swedish handballer who plays for H65 Höör and the Swedish national team.

Honours
Swedish League
 Gold: 2016/2017
EHF Challenge Cup:
Finalist: 2017
Norwegian League
 Silver: 2020/2021, 2021/2022
Swedish Cup
 Silver: 2022/2023

Personal life
She is the sister of Jerry Tollbring.

References

Swedish female handball players
1993 births
Living people
People from Norrtälje Municipality
Expatriate handball players
Swedish expatriates in Norway
Sportspeople from Stockholm County